Duran Lee (born 9 May 1995) is a Canadian professional soccer player.

Club career

Early career
Lee was a product of the Toronto FC academy programme.

Sigma FC
In 2016, Lee began playing for League1 Ontario side Sigma FC, making five appearances that season. He returned to Sigma the following year, making another five appearances and scoring one goal. In 2018, Lee made eleven league appearances for Sigma and made a further three appearances in the playoffs.

Vaughan Azzurri
In 2019, Lee joined defending League1 Ontario champions Vaughan Azzurri. He made nine league appearances for Vaughan that season, scoring one goal. Lee also played 90 minutes in both legs of Vaughan's Canadian Championship series against professional club HFX Wanderers.

HFX Wanderers
On 13 August 2019, Lee signed his first professional contract with Canadian Premier League side HFX Wanderers after impressing against them in the Canadian Championship. On 28 August 2019, he made his debut for Wanderers against Valour FC. On 14 December 2019, the club announced that Lee would not be returning for the 2020 season.

FC Edmonton
On 29 January 2020, Lee signed with FC Edmonton. In an interview, Lee stated that hoped to be utilized as a left-back for Edmonton, rather than a centre-back, which is where he played in Halifax. He went on to make two appearances for Edmonton during the shortened 2020 season.

Pacific FC
On 18 March 2021, Lee signed with Pacific FC. The next month on April 29, Pacific announced Lee would miss the entire 2021 season after sustaining a ruptured Achilles tendon in training. In January 2022 Pacific announced Lee would be departing the club.

Honours

Club
Pacific FC
Canadian Premier League: 2021

References

External links

1995 births
Living people
Association football defenders
Canadian soccer players
Soccer players from Toronto
Canadian expatriate soccer players
Expatriate soccer players in the United States
Canadian expatriate sportspeople in the United States
UConn Huskies men's soccer players
UMass Lowell River Hawks men's soccer players
HFX Wanderers FC players
FC Edmonton players
Pacific FC players
League1 Ontario players
Canadian Premier League players
Vaughan Azzurri players
Sigma FC players